Bluestone Wildlife Management Area (also known as Bluestone Lake Wildlife Management Area) is a wildlife management area in southern West Virginia surrounding Bluestone Lake and the New River. The section of the lake from just upstream of the Bluestone River to Bluestone Dam is in Bluestone State Park; the rest of the lake in West Virginia basin comprises Bluestone WMA. All together, the WMA comprises  of land and water.

The wildlife management area is operated by the West Virginia Division of Natural Resources Wildlife Resources Section to provide hunting and fishing opportunities to the public and to protect the natural resources of the land. The land is owned by the U.S. Army Corps of Engineers and leased to WVDNR.

Recreation
With the exception of camping, there are no fees for using the Wildlife Management Area. Day-use recreational opportunities include:
 Fishing (with required state license), including stocked trout on Indian Creek
 Hunting (with required state license)
 Horseback riding
 Canoeing
 Boating
 Rock climbing

Free boat launches provide access to Indian Creek, the New River, and Bluestone Lake.

Camping
There are seven camping areas spread along  of the New River and Bluestone Lake. All together, these sites provide 330 primitive campsites:
 Bertha – 55 lakefront sites
 Bull Falls – 15 lakefront sites
 Cedar Branch – 45 riverside sites
 Indian Mills – 15 sites
 Keatley – 15 sites
 Mouth of Indian Creek – 94 riverside sites
 Shanklin's Ferry – 91 riverside sites

Sherman Ballard Recreation Area
The Sherman Ballard Recreation Area has a cabin and barn which offers rustic accommodations. The cabin is an open air construction offering five bunk beds sets, a full kitchen, full enclosed bathroom, and covered porch.

The barn is the only one in the West Virginia State Parks system allowing users to bring their own horses rather than renting horses from a concessionaire. At one time, WVDNR biologists tried to ban horses from the WMA but were rebutted by a public outcry.

References

Campgrounds in West Virginia
Protected areas of Mercer County, West Virginia
Protected areas of Monroe County, West Virginia
Protected areas of Summers County, West Virginia
Wildlife management areas of West Virginia
IUCN Category V